Bandō Mitsugorō VII (September 21, 1882 - November 4, 1961) was a Japanese kabuki actor. He was the adopted father of Bandō Mitsugorō VIII. He was officially designated a living national treasure by the Japanese government. He was a recipient of the Person of Cultural Merit and a member of the Japan Art Academy.

1882 births
1961 deaths
Kabuki actors
Living National Treasures of Japan
Members of the Japan Art Academy
Persons of Cultural Merit
People from Tokyo
Male actors from Tokyo